GothBoiClique (also abbreviated as GBC) is an American emo rap collective based in Los Angeles, California. It was formed in 2012 by Wicca Phase Springs Eternal, Cold Hart, and Horse Head. The group's name comes from a beat that Cold Hart sent to Wicca Phase Springs Eternal. In 2016, the group released a mixtape, Yeah It's True.

History
GBC was formed in 2012 through Wicca Phase Springs Eternal (WPSE) attempting to put together a group through Tumblr with the intention of forming a collective of musicians who could mutually collaborate with and produce for one another and drawing connections between the emo, trap, dark wave, black metal and indie rock scenes. The founding line-up consisted of Wicca Phase, Cold Hart and Horse Head, taking their name from a beat titled "Gothboiclique" that Cold Hart had produced, which when WPSE read the name he jokingly tweeted "RT if you’re goth boi clique". The members of the group continued mostly independently for the next two years, despite continuing to gain members. In 2014, the members met each other in person, and soon after GBC became a sub-group of the newly founded hip hop collective Thraxxhouse, a Seattle-based offshoot of Raider Klan. This led to Lil Tracy (then known as Yung Bruh) joining Thraxxhouse later on in 2014, and quickly became a fan of GBC. In a 2018 interview with Pitchfork, he stated that he owned a secondhand GBC shirt that he wore "every day, to bed, in the morning, everywhere" and that he "looked up to Wicca Phase almost like on a stan level". He soon asked Horse Head to ask WPSE if he could join, who allowed, saying "Well, he wears the shirt enough!" 

In 2015, Thraxxhouse broke up, however GBC continued to operate independently. On September 25, 2016, Lil Peep announced that he had officially joined the group soon after the release of his mixtape Hellboy. The group released their debut collective mixtape "Yeah it's True" on June 25, 2016. On November 15, 2017, Lil Peep was found dead on his tour bus when his manager went to check on him in preparation for that night's performance at a Tucson, Arizona venue. In 2018, WPSE and GBC affiliates Lil Zubin, Jon Simmons, Nedarb, Fantasy Camp and Foxwedding formed Misery Club, a sub-group of GBC. In June 2019, GBC headlined a sold-out European tour. On June 28, 2019, they released the single Tiramisu, before departing on a North American headline tour. In 2020, Horse Head left Gothboiclique. However in autumn 2022, Horse Head seems to have rejoined the group.

Members

Current members

 Cold Hart (also goes by Jayyeah when producing) - vocals, production 
 Døves - vocals, production
 Fish Narc - production, instrumentation, vocals
 Horse Head - vocals, production, instrumentation
 JPDreamthug - vocals
 Lil Tracy - vocals, occasional production
 Mackned - vocals, production
 Wicca Phase Springs Eternal - vocals, production
 Yawns - instrumentation, production

Past members 
Lil Peep (died 2017) - vocals

Discography

Mixtapes
 Yeah It's True (2016)

Singles
 "Tiramisu" (2019)

References

External links
 

Emo musical groups from California
American hip hop groups
Hip hop collectives
Musical groups from Los Angeles
Musical groups established in 2012
2012 establishments in California